Basin View is a town in New South Wales, Australia in the City of Shoalhaven, on the shores of St Georges Basin. It is roughly 25 km south of Nowra, and approximately 200 km south of Sydney.

References 

Towns in the South Coast (New South Wales)
City of Shoalhaven